Euasteron is a genus of spiders in the family Zodariidae. It was first described in 2003 by Baehr. , it contains 17 species, all found in Australia.

Species
Euasteron comprises the following species:
 E. atriceps Baehr, 2003 — Australia (Western Australia)
 E. bartoni Baehr, 2003 — Australia (Victoria)
 E. carnarvon Baehr, 2003 — Australia (Western Australia)
 E. churchillae Baehr, 2003 — Australia (Northern Territory)
 E. enterprise Baehr, 2003 (type) — Australia (Queensland)
 E. gibsonae Baehr, 2003 — Australia (Northern Territory, Queensland)
 E. harveyi Baehr, 2003 — Australia (Western Australia)
 E. johannae Baehr, 2003 — Australia (Western Australia)
 E. juliannae Baehr, 2003 — Australia (Western Australia)
 E. krebsorum Baehr, 2003 — Australia (New South Wales, South Australia)
 E. lorne Baehr, 2003 — Australia (New South Wales)
 E. milledgei Baehr, 2003 — Australia (New South Wales)
 E. monteithorum Baehr, 2003 — Australia (Queensland, New South Wales)
 E. raveni Baehr, 2003 — Australia (Queensland)
 E. ulrichi Baehr, 2003 — Australia (Western Australia)
 E. ursulae Baehr, 2003 — Australia (Western Australia)
 E. willeroo Baehr, 2003 — Australia (Northern Territory)

References

Zodariidae
Araneomorphae genera
Spiders of Australia